Ronald H. Lingren (June 26, 1935 – June 1, 2015) was an American academic and politician who served as a member of the Wisconsin State Assembly.

Early life and education 
Lingren was born in Gowrie, Iowa. His father was a farmer and his mother was a teacher. Lindgren was one of four children. He earned a bachelor's degree from Iowa State University and a PhD in clinical psychology from the University of Iowa.

Career 
After earning his doctorate, Lingren became a member of the faculty of the University of Wisconsin–Milwaukee. He was also a member of the United States Army and the Air Force Reserve Command.

Lingren was elected to the Wisconsin State Assembly in 1974, defeating incumbent John H. Niebler, and was re-elected in 1976 and 1978. He was a Democrat.

Lingren had two children. He died in Jacksonville Beach, Florida.

References

People from Webster County, Iowa
Democratic Party members of the Wisconsin State Assembly
Military personnel from Wisconsin
United States Army soldiers
United States Air Force airmen
University of Wisconsin–Milwaukee faculty
Iowa State University alumni
University of Iowa alumni
1935 births
2015 deaths
People from Jacksonville Beach, Florida